Life Goes On is a studio album by American composer and pianist Carla Bley with saxophonist Andy Sheppard and bass guitarist Steve Swallow released by the ECM label on February 14, 2020.
The album consists of three suites divided into shorter segments.

Reception
Jim Macnie of JazzTimes stated, "The fourth album in a quarter-century’s worth of collabs by the buoyant trio of the pianist, bassist Steve Swallow, and saxophonist Andy Sheppard, Life Goes On teems with the kind of balance that has marked their previous discs, but it also boasts an extra dose of eloquence... The group’s chemistry is ultra-refined at this late date; the carefully calibrated sharing of duties brings a quizzical serenity to this improv-slanted chamber music." Brian Payne of Jazz Journal commented, "Bley is distinctive on piano throughout the album, Sheppard supple and circuitous on tenor and soprano sax and Swallow rich, warm and melodic on bass. Bley says “We’re essentially a chamber music ensemble and this allows me to write music for us free of bombast and exaggeration”. If you add “quirky”, “original” and “politically incorrect”, I think her words would likely trump any other description of this most intriguing album." Paul de Barros in his review for DownBeat wrote, "During Bley’s long and rich career, there have been times when her work has merely seemed smart, but not emotionally resonant. Here, it’s both, and her trio is all in for life—as long as it lasts."

Track listing

Personnel
Carla Bley – piano
Andy Sheppard – soprano saxophone, tenor saxophone  
Steve Swallow – bass guitar

References

ECM Records albums
Carla Bley albums
2020 albums
Albums produced by Manfred Eicher